Amoeba is a Malayalam film, the second film directed by Manoj Kana after his critically acclaimed Chayilyam. The film stars Aneesh G. Menon, Athmiya Rajan, Anumol, Indrans and Anoop Chandran in the lead.

Plot
A woman from Kasargod lives amidst fears of contamination by Endosulfan.

The film captured two contrasting images of life in an IT hub in Bangalore with that of life in Endosulfan struck Kasargodu.

Cast
 Aneesh G Menon
 Athmiya Rajan as Nimisha
 Anumol
 Anoop Chandran
 Indrans 
 Manya
 Neethu Janardhanan
Moideen Koya

Awards
The film won the "Best Second Story" award at the 46th Kerala State Film Awards in 2016.

References

External links
 

2016 films
2010s Malayalam-language films